Andrea Vescovi (born 3 November 1994) is an Italian sport shooter.

He participated at the 2018 ISSF World Shooting Championships, winning a medal.

References

External links

Living people
1994 births
Italian male sport shooters
Trap and double trap shooters
People from Città di Castello
Universiade gold medalists for Italy
Universiade medalists in shooting
Medalists at the 2015 Summer Universiade
Sportspeople from the Province of Perugia
21st-century Italian people